Amara Zaragoza (born December 5, 1980), known by her stage name Tamara Feldman, is an American actress.

Career
Feldman is known for playing Marybeth Dunston in the horror film Hatchet (2006) and for her roles in the television series Smallville (2002), Supernatural (2006), Dirty Sexy Money (2007–2009), Gossip Girl (2008–2012) and The Mob Doctor (2012–2013).

She was replaced by Danielle Harris as Marybeth Dunston in Hatchet II, Hatchet III and Victor Crowley.
She was featured in the music video of Nsync's 2000 hit "This I Promise You". She is shown as one of the couples sitting at a table towards the end of the video as well as walking in slow motion at the 2:14 time stamp.

Personal life
In 2015, Feldman was diagnosed with multiple sclerosis. She decided to ride a horse across the United States in aid of the charity Race to Erase MS, which she documented on her website "And So I Ride". After four months, the journey came to a close due to fatigue and health problems. Her sister also has MS.

Filmography

Film

Television

References

External links
 
 Interview at Sequential Tart
 Interview at JoBlo.com

1980 births
21st-century American actresses
Actresses from Kansas
American film actresses
American television actresses
Actors from Wichita, Kansas
People with multiple sclerosis
Living people